A producer price index (PPI) is a price index that measures the average changes in prices received by domestic producers for their output. 

Its importance is being undermined by the steady decline in manufactured goods as a share of spending.

Related measures 
A number of countries that now report a producer price index previously reported a wholesale price index.

PPIs around the world

United States 

In the US, the PPI was known as the Wholesale Price Index, or WPI, up to 1978.  The PPI is one of the oldest continuous systems of statistical data published by the Bureau of Labor Statistics, as well as one of the oldest economic time series compiled by the Federal Government.  The origins of the index can be found in an 1891 U.S. Senate resolution authorizing the Senate Committee on Finance to investigate the effects of the tariff laws "upon the imports and exports, the growth, development, production, and prices of agricultural and manufactured articles at home and abroad".

India 

The Indian Wholesale Price Index (WPI) was first published in 1902, and it now uses CPI. PPI is not yet formulated in India.

See also 
 Consumer price index
 Inflation
 Substitution
 2000s commodities boom
 2020s commodities boom

References

External links 
 IMF PPI manual
 United States PPI Homepage
 Get US PPI statistics
 Historical PPI releases
 French PPI composition and evolution 

Price indices
Management cybernetics